Ansha Sayed  is an Indian actress. She is best known for portraying Sub-Inspector Purvi in C.I.D.. Her other notable roles include Leelavati on Laagi Tujhse Lagan, Jenny in Rang Badalti Odhani.

Career
Ansha Sayed has appeared in episodes of Aahat and Laagi Tujhse Lagan. She is  known for her role as Sub-Inspector Purvi in C.I.D..

Television

References

External links

Living people
Actresses from Mumbai
Indian television actresses
Indian soap opera actresses
Actresses in Hindi television
Year of birth missing (living people)
21st-century Indian actresses